is a programming block on the Japanese television network TV Asahi featuring new episodes of tokusatsu television series from the Super Sentai, Kamen Rider and Metal Heroes. Both series have decades of history and have been intertwined in the public imagination for some time, not least of all because the driving creative force behind both was manga artist Shotaro Ishinomori and both were produced by the same production company, Toei Company; however, they did not air together until 2000 with Kamen Rider Kuuga and Kyuukyuu Sentai GoGoFive (which was quickly replaced by Mirai Sentai Timeranger 2 weeks later), though at the time they were not acknowledged together. Super Hero Time airs every Sunday morning, from 9:00 to 10:00 JST. The block is shown all over Japan via the All-Nippon News Network. Though, in other prefectures, one or both shows can be seen on other stations which are not affiliated with ANN.

History
Starting in the late 1960s, the hour was originally meant for educational children's programs. Over the years the hour began including henshin (transforming) hero programs, one of the first being .

On October 4, 1987, Toei's Choujinki Metalder was moved from a Monday evening 19:00 JST time slot to a Sunday morning 9:00 JST time slot, followed by a move of Kidou Keiji Jiban to 8:00 JST Sunday morning on April 2, 1989. Similarly, on April 6, 1997, Denji Sentai Megaranger was moved from a Friday evening 17:00 JST time slot to the Sunday morning 7:30 JST time slot, pairing it up with B-Robo Kabutack. The Super Sentai Series programs would continue to air at 7:30 JST after the Metal Hero Series ended and Moero!! Robocon aired in its slot on January 31, 1999, and was followed by the premiere of Kamen Rider Kuuga on January 30, 2000.

Although a Super Sentai Series and a Kamen Rider Series aired side-by-side, the Super Hero Time branding of the shows did not begin until the Autumn 2003 broadcast season (known as  until the 2005 broadcast season). As part of the block, actors from the programs often interact with each other to promote each other's shows, films, and perform skits. Satoru Akashi (Mitsuomi Takahashi) and Souji Tendou (Hiro Mizushima) talked about each other's universes, and Master Xia Fu (voiced by Ichirō Nagai) often showed up on the Den-Liner to talk with the Imagin and Ryotaro Nogami (Takeru Satoh) in cartoonish caricatures. The 2008 broadcast introduced new changes to the block, including scenes from the show's episode.

For the 2009 television season, Kamen Rider Decade only aired for 31 episodes, allowing for the broadcast of Kamen Rider W for a full 49-episode run. This has introduced an offset of five months between the series premieres of the yearly Super Sentai Series (which premieres in mid-February) and Kamen Rider Series (which premiered in early September since then), instead of an approximate month-long offset that had existed before (Kamen Rider Series premiered in mid-January). This offset was shortened to four months after the finale of the 53 episode-long Kamen Rider Wizard, delaying the premiere of subsequent Kamen Rider Series to early October until the debut of Kamen Rider Build in early September, resulting in the increase of the offset to seven months. In 2019, this offset was reduced to six months with the premiere of Kishiryu Sentai Ryusoulger in March after its time slot was occupied by the four-week-long miniseries Super Sentai Strongest Battle.

The Super Hero Time block is part of the larger  block, which begins at 8:30 JST with the airing of an ABC Television-produced shōjo anime animated by Toei Animation (currently the Pretty Cure series) and ends at 10:00 JST after the airing of the Super Sentai series. All of the shows are properties of Bandai, who also sponsors the block. While Super Hero Time began airing with such anime in its inception, the "Nichi Asa Kids Time" branding did not begin until March 4, 2007.

On Sunday, October 1, 2017, the block moved to 9:00 JST, with the Kamen Rider series airing before the Super Sentai series. In 2020, production of new episodes for both Kamen Rider Zero-One and Mashin Sentai Kiramager was temporarily halted due to the impact of COVID-19 pandemic in Japan, including one of Kiramagers cast members being infected, with special episodes containing old, unreleased footage being aired in the block until June, when production resumed, following a series of health and safety compliances.

Line-ups

Japan

September 2003 - September 2017

October 2017 - present

Hong Kong

Coverage area
This block has been shown on TV Asahi (Tokyo), Mētele (Nagoya), ABC (Osaka) and all other stations of the All-Nippon News Network (Nationwide) via satellite. In other parts of the country, some stations not affiliated with ANN are showing either one or both shows.

Yamanashi
Yamanashi Broadcasting System (YBS) (affiliated with the Nippon News Network, owned by Nippon TV) - Super Sentai
UHF Television Yamanashi (UTY) (affiliated with the Japan News Network, owned by TBS) - Kamen Rider
Toyama
Kitanihon Broadcasting (KNB) (affiliated with the Nippon News Network, owned by Nippon TV) - Super Sentai and Kamen Rider (formerly)
Tulip Television (TUT) (affiliated with the Japan News Network, owned by TBS) - Kamen Rider (until Blade)
Fukui
Fukui Broadcasting Corporation (FBC) (affiliated with both NNN and ANN) - Super Sentai
Fukui Television Broadcasting (FTB) (affiliated with the Fuji News Network, owned by Fuji Television) - Kamen Rider
Shimane/Tottori
Broadcasting System of San-in (BSS) (affiliated with the Japan News Network, owned by TBS) - Kamen Rider
San-in Chūō Television Broadcasting (TSK) (affiliated with the Fuji News Network, owned by Fuji Television) - Super Sentai
Tokushima
Shikoku Broadcasting (JRT) (affiliated with the Nippon News Network, owned by Nippon TV) - Super Sentai and Kamen Rider
Kōchi
Television Kochi (KUTV) (affiliated with the Japan News Network, owned by TBS) - Super Sentai and Kamen Rider (formerly)
Miyazaki
Miyazaki Broadcasting (MRT) (affiliated with the Japan News Network, owned by TBS) - Super Sentai and Kamen Rider

External links
 Official Bandai Hong Kong Super Hero Time Facebook Website

Toei tokusatsu
Television programming blocks in Asia
TV Asahi
Japanese children's television series